Duncan Vignale is a Canadian judoka who has played a significant role in the development of judo in Canada and especially Ontario. He has held several important positions such as President of Judo Ontario and Vice-President of Judo Canada, coached the Ontario judo team, and served as a kata judge for the International Judo Federation. He won the Syl Apps Special Achievement Award in 2011, was made a Lifetime Member of Judo Ontario in 2013, and is one of just seventeen Canadian judoka to achieve the rank of hachidan (eighth dan). Vignale was also selected as an alternate to Doug Rogers for the 1964 Summer Olympics.

Interviews

See also
Judo in Ontario
Judo in Canada
List of Canadian judoka

References

Canadian male judoka
Living people
Year of birth missing (living people)